Elżbieta Urbańczyk (born 26 April 1971 in Nowy Dwór Mazowiecki) is a Polish sprint canoer who competed from 1988 to 2002. She won seven medals at the ICF Canoe Sprint World Championships with a gold (K-2 500 m: 1994), three silvers (K-1 200 m: 2001, K-2 200 m: 1997, K-2 500 m: 1995), and three bronzes (K-1 200 m: 2002, K-2 200 m: 1994, K-2 1000 m: 1997).

Urbańczyk also competed in four Summer Olympics, earning her best finish of fifth in the K-1 500 m event at Sydney in 2000.

References

1971 births
Canoeists at the 1988 Summer Olympics
Canoeists at the 1992 Summer Olympics
Canoeists at the 1996 Summer Olympics
Canoeists at the 2000 Summer Olympics
Living people
Olympic canoeists of Poland
Polish female canoeists
People from Nowy Dwór Mazowiecki
ICF Canoe Sprint World Championships medalists in kayak
Sportspeople from Masovian Voivodeship